The Gassmann equation, first described by Fritz Gassmann, is used in geophysics and its relations are receiving more attention as seismic data are increasingly used for reservoir monitoring. The Gassmann equation is the most common way of performing a fluid substitution model from one known parameter.

Procedure
These formulations are from Avseth et al. (2006).

Given an initial set of velocities and densities, and  corresponding to a rock with an initial set of fluids, you can compute the velocities and densities of the rock with another set of fluid. Often these velocities are measured from well logs, but might also come from a theoretical model.

Step 2: Apply Gassmann's relation, of the following form, to transform the saturated bulk modulus:

Step 3: Leave the shear modulus unchanged (rigidity is independent of fluid type):

Step 4: Correct the bulk density for the change in fluid:

Step 5: recompute the fluid substituted velocities

Rearranging for Ksat

Given

Let

and

then

Or, expanded

Assumptions

Load induced pore pressure is homogeneous and identical in all pores
This assumption imply that shear modulus of the saturated rock is the same as the shear modulus of the dry rock, .

Porosity does not change with different saturating fluids
Gassmann fluid substitution requires that the porosity remain constant. The assumption being that, all other things being equal, different saturating fluids should not affect the porosity of the rock. This does not take into account diagenetic processes, such as cementation or dissolution, that vary with changing geochemical conditions in the pores. For example, quartz cement is more likely to precipitate in water-filled pores than it is in hydrocarbon-filled ones (Worden and Morad, 2000). So the same rock may have different porosity in different locations due to the local water saturation.

Frequency effects are negligible in the measurements
Gassmann's equations are essentially the lower frequency limit of Biot's more general equations of motion for poroelastic materials. At seismic frequencies (10–100 Hz), the error in using Gassmann's equation may be negligible. However, when constraining the necessary parameters with sonic measurements at logging frequencies (~20 kHz), this assumption may be violated. A better option, yet more computationally intense, would be to use Biot's frequency-dependent equation to calculate the fluid substitution effects. If the output from this process will be integrated with seismic data, the obtained elastic parameters must also be corrected for dispersion effects.

Rock frame is not altered by the saturating fluid
Gassmann's equations assumes no chemical interactions between the fluids and the solids.

References

Geophysics